"Much @ Edgefest '99" is a compilation album distributed by MuchMusic, promoting the 1999 Edgefest touring rock festival. The album consists primarily of previously unreleased recordings (remixes, live versions, B-sides, etc.) by the bands that toured with Edgefest that year. The album peaked at #8 on the RPM Canadian Albums Chart and was certified Gold by the CRIA in 2000.

Track listing
Hole - Best Sunday Dress - 4:24
Silverchair - Freak - 3:47
Age of Electric - Remote Control - 3:40
Creed - My Own Prison (Acoustic Version) - 4:37
Moist - Morphine - 5:34
Sloan - Glad to Be Here - 2:51
Treble Charger - Scatterbrain (Concentrated Mix) - 3:56
Big Wreck - Ill Advice - 4:04
Collective Soul - Shine - 5:06
Matthew Good Band - Fated - 3:04
The Watchmen - I'm Blind - 4:46
Wide Mouth Mason - King of Poison (Live) - 3:42
Blur - Girls & Boys - 4:50
Rascalz - The Man That I Am - 3:30
Elastica - Connection - 2:20
Holly McNarland - The Box (Live) - 4:04
The Tea Party - Life Line - 4:35
Econoline Crush - Surefire (Never Enough) Farenheit 451 Remix - 3:18

References

External links
Edgesfest
Edgefest History

1999 compilation albums
1999 live albums
Live rock albums